The St. Roch's Church is a church in Vienna and was built in 1642 by Ferdinand III in thanks for the preservation of Vienna from the plague.

References

Roman Catholic churches in Vienna
17th-century Roman Catholic church buildings in Austria
Baroque architecture in Austria
Roman Catholic churches completed in 1642
1642 establishments in Austria
Plague churches